Stugeta subinfuscata, the dusky sapphire, is a butterfly of the family Lycaenidae. It is found in southern Africa.

The wingspan is 25–28 mm for males and 27–30 mm for females. Adults are on wing in summer, with peaks in September and October. There are multiple generations per year.

The larvae feed on Tapinanthus oleifolius.

Subspecies
Iolaus subinfuscata subinfuscata
Iolaus subinfuscata reynoldsi Dickson, 1980 — succulent karoo and arid savannah in Northern Cape from Garies to Upington and Kuruman, north to Namibia and Botswana

References

External links
Die Gross-Schmetterlinge der Erde 13: Die Afrikanischen Tagfalter. Plate XIII 67 c

Butterflies described in 1910
Taxa named by Karl Grünberg
Iolaini